Tehuelches Department is a  department of Chubut Province in Argentina.

The provincial subdivision has a total area of 14,750 km², and its capital city is José de San Martín, which is located around 1,870 km from the Capital federal.

Demographics 
According to INDEC estimates for June 2008, the population of the department reached 5.498 inhabitants.

Source: Instituto Nacional de Estadísticas y Censos (INDEC).

Climate

Settlements
Gobernador Costa
José de San Martín
Río Pico
Doctor Atilio Oscar Viglione
Alto Río Pico
Puesto Viejo
Putrachoique
Laguna Blanca
Arroyo Arenoso
Aldea Shaman
Lago Vintter
Nueva Lubecka
Rio Frias

Economy 
The economic activities carried out are services, but the main economic activity is still sheep farming.

See also
Departments of Chubut province

References

Departments of Chubut Province